(), is the designation for German junior non-commissioned officers (NCOs) in the German Armed Forces. The category was a division of the NCO class, separating junior NCOs from Unteroffiziere mit Portepee, or senior NCOs (who wore the sword knot). The name is derived from earlier traditions in which German senior NCOs (Feldwebel) would carry the officer's sidearms (sword, sabre) with the officer's swordknot (made from silver or gold lace).

Ranks in this category:
Unteroffizier (navy: Maat)
Fahnenjunker (navy: Seekadett)
Stabsunteroffizier (navy: Obermaat, historical: Unterfeldwebel / Unterwachtmeister)

Table of ranks

See also
 Unteroffiziere mit Portepee - NCOs with portepee
 Rank insignia of the German Bundeswehr

References 

Military ranks of Germany